South Beach is an American action/adventure television series that aired on NBC from June 6 to August 12, 1993, during the summer of 1993. The series was created by Dick Wolf and Robert DeLaurentis and starred Yancy Butler, who had been the lead actress a year earlier in another failed Wolf/DeLaurentis series, Mann & Machine.

Set in South Beach, Florida, the Modesty Blaise-inspired storyline had Butler playing Kate Patrick, a thief who, along with her partner Vernon, is given the choice of going to jail or working for a government agency run by a man named Roberts (played by John Glover). The series saw Kate and Vernon (played by Eagle-Eye Cherry) take on various missions for Roberts, which usually called on the duo to make use of their skills as thieves. The series also co-starred Patti D'Arbanville. The first episode guest-starred the British actor, Christopher Bowen as Dimitriev.

Seven episodes were produced of this series, but only six were aired.

Cast
 Yancy Butler as Kate Patrick
 John Glover as Roberts
 Patti D'Arbanville as Roxanne
 Eagle-Eye Cherry as Vernon
 Donna Rae Allen as Winona Donnelly

Episodes

References

External links
 

NBC original programming
Television series by Universal Television
Television shows set in Miami
1993 American television series debuts
1993 American television series endings
Television series created by Dick Wolf
Television series by Wolf Films